Madhya Bharat, also known as Malwa Union, was an Indian state in west-central India, created on 28 May 1948 from twenty-five princely states which until 1947 had been part of the Central India Agency, with Jiwajirao Scindia as its Rajpramukh.

Gwalior was the winter capital and Indore was the summer capital. It was bordered by the states of Bombay (presently Gujarat and Maharashtra) to the southwest, Rajasthan to the northwest, Uttar Pradesh to the north, and Vindhya Pradesh to the east, and Bhopal State and Madhya Pradesh to the southeast. The population was mostly Hindu and Hindi-speaking.

On 1 November 1956, Madhya Bharat, together with the states of Vindhya Pradesh and Bhopal State, was merged into Madhya Pradesh.

Districts
Madhya Bharat comprised sixteen districts and these districts were initially divided into three Commissioners' Divisions, which were later reduced to two. The districts were:
 Bhind District
 Gird District
 Morena District
 Guna District
 Shivpuri District
 Rajgarh District
 Bhilsa District
 Shajapur District
 Ujjain District
 Indore District
 Dewas District
 Ratlam District
 Dhar District
 Jhabua District
 Nimar District
 Mandsaur District

Politics
The nominal head of Madhya Bharat state was Rajpramukh. It had also the post of an Uparajpramukh. The state had a Vidhan Sabha of 99 members, who were elected from 79 constituencies (59 single member and 20 double member). There were 9 Lok Sabha constituencies in the state (7 single member and 2 double member).

Jivaji Rao Scindia was Rajpramukh of the state from 28 May 1948 to 31 October 1956 and Liladhar Joshi was the first Chief Minister. He was succeeded by Gopi Krishna Vijayvargiya in May 1949.  On 18 October 1950, Takhatmal jain (Jalori) became the third Chief Minister of Madhya Bharat.

In the 1952 Madhya Bharat Legislative Assembly election, the Indian National Congress won 75  seats and the Hindu Mahasabha won 11 seats. Mishrilal Gangwal of  Indian National Congress  became the Chief Minister on 3 March 1952. After his resignation, Takhatmal Jain (Jalori) again became the Chief Minister on 16 April 1955. He was the Chief Minister of the state till 31 October 1956.

Geography

Madhya Bharat state was situated in the Madhya Bharat plateau (presently lying under most of northwestern Madhya Pradesh state and Central Rajasthan). This plateau is bounded by the Indo-Gangetic plain to the north, the Bundelkhand upland to the east, the Malwa Plateau to the south, and the East Rajasthan Uplands on the west.

References 

 
States and territories disestablished in 1956
History of Madhya Pradesh (1947–present)
Former states and territories of India
1956 disestablishments in India